Helgakviða may refer to:

Helgakviða Hjörvarðssonar ("Lay of Helgi Hjörvarðsson"), a poem collected in the Poetic Edda
Helgakviða Hundingsbana I, the First Lay of Helgi Hundingsbane, an Old Norse poem found in the Poetic Edda
Helgakviða Hundingsbana II, the Second Lay of Helgi Hundingsbane, an Old Norse poem found in the Poetic Edda